Green Berry Samuels (February 1, 1806 – January 5, 1859)  was a Virginia lawyer, politician and judge.

Early life
Born in Shenandoah County, Virginia on February 6, 1806, Green Berry Samuels was a son of Isaac Samuels (1762–1819) and Elizabeth Pennybacker (1766–1824). He received a private classical education, then he studied law at Winchester Law School under Judge Henry St. George Tucker Sr.

On April 12, 1831, Samuels married Maria Gore Coffman and they had 5 children who reached adulthood:  Elizabeth Margaret Samuels, Isaac Pennybacker Samuels, Anna Maria Samuels, Green Berry Samuels, Jr., and Samuel Coffman Samuels.

Career
Samuels was admitted to the bar in 1827 and began his legal practice at Woodstock, Virginia, the Shenandoah county seat. Voters of Virginia's 16th congressional district elected him as a Democrat to the Twenty-sixth Congress (March 4, 1839 – March 3, 1841), where he succeeded his cousin Isaac Samuels Pennybacker, a congressman and later senator from Virginia. However, Samuels chose not to see re-election, so William A. Harris succeeded him until population losses in the next census caused Virginia to lose that congressional seat.

Voters from Shenandoah, Hardy and Warren Counties elected Samuels as one of their four delegates to the Virginia Constitutional Convention of 1850, alongside William Seymour, Giles Cook and Samuel C. Williams, but Samuels resigned on December 10, 1850, after legislators elected him a judge of the circuit court. Mark Bird then succeeded him at the convention. Two years later, in 1852, legislators elected Samuels to the Court of Appeals.

Death
Green Berry Samuels died suddenly in Richmond, Virginia on January 5, 1859, at the age of 52. His remains were returned to Woodstock for burial in the Old Lutheran Graveyard (Emanuel Lutheran Church Cemetery).

References

Bibliography

1806 births
Justices of the Supreme Court of Virginia
Virginia lawyers
1859 deaths
People from Shenandoah County, Virginia
Democratic Party members of the United States House of Representatives from Virginia
19th-century American politicians
19th-century American judges
19th-century American lawyers
Winchester Law School alumni
Virginia circuit court judges